Donald Brook (born 17 September 1938) is an Australian former sports shooter. He competed at the 1972, 1976 and the 1988 Summer Olympics.

References

External links
 

1938 births
Living people
Australian male sport shooters
Olympic shooters of Australia
Shooters at the 1972 Summer Olympics
Shooters at the 1976 Summer Olympics
Shooters at the 1988 Summer Olympics
Place of birth missing (living people)
Commonwealth Games medallists in shooting
Commonwealth Games silver medallists for Australia
Shooters at the 1986 Commonwealth Games
20th-century Australian people
21st-century Australian people
Medallists at the 1986 Commonwealth Games